Kingfisher Airlines flew to 25 destinations as of 30 September 2012, the day it operated its last flights.

Notes

References

Lists of airline destinations